What the World Needs Now may refer to:

 "What the World Needs Now Is Love", a 1965 popular song with lyrics by Hal David and music composed by Burt Bacharach
 What the World Needs Now Is Love (Wynonna Judd album), 2003
 What the World Needs Now Is Love (Sweet Inspirations album), 1968
 What the World Needs Now: The Music of Burt Bacharach, a 1997 McCoy Tyner album
 What the World Needs Now..., 2015 album by Public Image Ltd
 "What the World Needs Now" (Glee), an episode of the American musical television series Glee

See also
 What the World Needs Now Is ...: The Definitive Collection, 1994 album by Jackie DeShannon
What the World Needs Now: Stan Getz Plays Burt Bacharach and Hal David, 1968 album by saxophonist Stan Getz